The siege of Kaminogō Castle was a battle in 1562, during the Sengoku period (16th century) of Japan. Kaminogō Castle was an Imagawa clan outpost located in eastern Aichi Prefecture, in what is now the town of Gamagōri.

With the help of his ninja vassal Hattori Hanzō, Matsudaira Motoyasu (later known as Tokugawa Ieyasu) laid siege to and stormed the castle.  The Matsudaira force captured the castle from Udono Nagateru, a general of the Imagawa. Hanzo saving the daughters of Tokugawa Ieyasu from the Kaminogo castle with a small group of ninja and also capturing many high ranking members of Imagawa clan.

Motoyasu order Ishikawa Kazumasa as guardian of the Imagawa family, when Ieyasu managed to convince Imagawa Ujizane to release his family. Motoyasu obtained many useful hostages to use against the Imagawa, who were then in possession of his own family.

References

The Samurai Sourcebook
Turnbull: Ninja AD 1460–1650, p44.

1562 in Japan
Kaminogo Castle 1562
Conflicts in 1562
Kaminogo Castle 1562